Hargurnek Singh Sandhu (born January 26, 1962 in Jamsher Khas, Jalandhar, Punjab, India), known as "Nick" or "Niki", is an Indian-born Canadian former field hockey defender.

Sandhu participated in two consecutive Summer Olympics for Canada, starting in 1984. After having finished in tenth position in Los Angeles, California, the resident of Vancouver, British Columbia ended up in eleventh place without h the Men's National Team in the Seoul Games.

International senior competitions

 1984 – Olympic Games, Los Angeles (10th)
 1988 – Olympic Games, Seoul (11th)
 1990 – World Cup, Lahore (11th)

References
 Canadian Olympic Committee

External links
 

1962 births
Living people
Canadian male field hockey players
Olympic field hockey players of Canada
Field hockey players at the 1984 Summer Olympics
Field hockey players at the 1988 Summer Olympics
Pan American Games gold medalists for Canada
Pan American Games silver medalists for Canada
Field hockey players at the 1983 Pan American Games
Field hockey players at the 1987 Pan American Games
Field hockey players at the 1991 Pan American Games
Canadian sportspeople of Indian descent
Canadian people of Punjabi descent
Sportspeople from Jalandhar
Field hockey players from Punjab, India
Indian emigrants to Canada
Field hockey players from Vancouver
Pan American Games medalists in field hockey
1990 Men's Hockey World Cup players
Medalists at the 1983 Pan American Games
Medalists at the 1987 Pan American Games
Medalists at the 1991 Pan American Games